This is a list of medical schools located in Indonesia. Recent update from 2022, there are currently 92 active institutes of higher education that runs medical school from all over Indonesia. These provinces Bangka Belitung, North Kalimantan, and West Sulawesi does not have any medical school program on their own province

Medical School Rank
The top 15 medical schools in Indonesia, as of the year 2018 based on the study by PDAT (Pusat Data Analisa Tempo / Tempo Center of Data Analysis):

 Faculty of Medicine University of Indonesia
 Faculty of Medicine Andalas University, Padang, Sumatera Barat 
 Faculty of Medicine Gadjah Mada University, Yogyakarta
 Faculty of Medicine Airlangga University, Surabaya
 Faculty of Medicine Padjadjaran University, Bandung
 Faculty of Medicine Diponegoro University / Diponegoro University, Semarang
 Universitas Hassanudin - Makkasar
 Universitas Sriwijaya - Palembang
 Universitas Sumatera Utara - Medan
 Universitas TRISAKTI - Jakarta
 Universitas UDAYANA - Denpasar
 Faculty of Medicine Atma Jaya Catholic University
 Faculty of Medicine Brawijaya University, Malang
 Faculty of Medicine , Jakarta
 Faculty of Medicine Sebelas Maret University, Surakarta

Aceh
Faculty of Medicine, School of Medicine Syiah Kuala University, Banda Aceh

Faculty of Medicine, School of Medicine Malikusalleh University, Lhokseumawe

Faculty of Medicine, School of Medicine Abulyatama University, Aceh Besar

North Sumatra
Faculty of Medicine, School of Medicine Sumatera Utara University, Medan

Faculty of Medicine, Dentistry, and Health Studies, School of Medicine Prima Indonesia University Medan

Faculty of Medicine, School of Medicine Methodist Indonesia University, Medan

Faculty of Medicine, School of Medicine Sumatera Utara Islamic University, Medan

Faculty of Medicine, School of Medicine Muhammadiyah University of Sumatera Utara, Medan

Faculty of Medicine, School of Medicine HKBP Nommensen University, Medan

Riau
Faculty of Medicine Riau University, Pekanbaru
Faculty of Medicine Abdurrab University, Pekanbaru

West Sumatra
Faculty of Medicine, School of Medicine Andalas University, Padang

Faculty of Medicine, School of Medicine Baiturrahmah University, Padang

Riau Islands
Faculty of Medicine Batam University, Batam

Jambi
Faculty of Medicine and Health Studies, School of Medicine Jambi University, Jambi

Bengkulu
Faculty of Medicine and Health Studies, School of Medicine Bengkulu University, Bengkulu

South Sumatra
Faculty of Medicine Sriwijaya University, Palembang
Faculty of Medicine Muhammadiyah University of Palembang, Palembang

Lampung
Faculty of Medicine Lampung University, Bandar Lampung
Faculty of Medicine Malahayati University, Bandar Lampung

Banten
Faculty of Medicine Sultan Ageng Tirtayasa University, Cilegon
Faculty of Medicine Pelita Harapan University, Tangerang Regency

Jakarta
Faculty of Medicine Atma Jaya Catholic University
Faculty of Medicine Tarumanagara University
Faculty of Medicine Trisakti University
Faculty of Medicine Yarsi University
Faculty of Medicine University of Indonesia
Faculty of Medicine Krida Wacana Christian University
Faculty of Medicine Christian University of Indonesia
Faculty of Medicine Pembangunan Nasional Veteran University
Faculty of Medicine Muhammadiyah University of Jakarta
Faculty of Medicine Gunadarma University
Faculty of Medicine Prof. Dr. Hamka University
Faculty of Medicine Syarif Hidayatullah Islamic State University of Jakarta

West Java
Faculty of Medicine Padjadjaran University, Sumedang Regency
Faculty of Medicine Maranatha Christian University, Bandung
Faculty of Medicine Jenderal Achmad Yani University, Cimahi
Faculty of Medicine Bandung Islamic University, Bandung
Faculty of Medicine Pasundan University, Bandung
Faculty of Medicine Swadaya Gunung Jati University, Cirebon
Faculty of Military Medicine The Republic of Indonesia Defense University, Bogor Regency

Central Java
Faculty of Medicine Diponegoro University, Semarang
Faculty of Medicine Sebelas Maret University, Surakarta
Faculty of Medicine Jenderal Soedirman University, Purwokerto
Faculty of Medicine Sultan Agung Islamic University, Semarang
Faculty of Medicine Muhammadiyah University of Surakarta, Sukoharjo Regency
Faculty of Medicine Muhammadiyah University of Semarang, Semarang
Faculty of Medicine Soegijapranata Catholic University, Semarang
Faculty of Medicine Muhammadiyah University of Purwokerto, Banyumas Regency
Faculty of Medicine Wahid Hasyim University, Semarang

Special Region of Yogyakarta
Faculty of Medicine Gadjah Mada University, Yogyakarta
Faculty of Medicine Muhammadiyah University of Yogyakarta, Yogyakarta
Faculty of Medicine Islamic University of Indonesia, Yogyakarta
Faculty of Medicine Duta Wacana Christian University, Yogyakarta
Faculty of Medicine Ahmad Dahlan University, Yogyakarta

East Java
Faculty of Medicine Hang Tuah University, Surabaya
Faculty of Medicine Airlangga University, Surabaya
Faculty of Medicine Wijaya Kusuma University, Surabaya
Faculty of Medicine Brawijaya University, Malang
Faculty of Medicine Maulana Malik Ibrahim State Islamic University Malang, Batu
Faculty of Medicine University of Muhammadiyah Malang, Malang
Faculty of Medicine Jember University, Jember
Faculty of Medicine Surabaya University, Surabaya
Faculty of Medicine Widya Mandala Catholic University, Surabaya
Faculty of Medicine Ciputra University, Surabaya
Faculty of Medicine Nahdlatul Ulama University of Surabaya, Surabaya
Faculty of Medicine Malang Islamic University, Malang
Faculty of Medicine Muhammadiyah University of Surabaya, Surabaya

Bali
Faculty of Medicine Udayana University, Denpasar
Faculty of Medicine and Health Sciences Warmadewa University, Denpasar
Faculty of Medicine Ganesha University of Education, Buleleng Regency

West Nusa Tenggara
Faculty of Medicine Mataram University, Mataram
Faculty of Medicine Al-Azhar Islamic University, Mataram

Easr Nusa Tenggara
Faculty of Medicine Nusa Cendana University, Kupang

West Kalimantan
Faculty of Medicine Tanjungpura University, Pontianak

Central Kalimantan
Faculty of Medicine Palang Karaya University, Palangkaraya

South Kalimantan
Faculty of Medicine Lambung Mangkurat University, Banjarmasin

East Kalimantan
Faculty of Medicine Mulawarman University, Samarinda

North Sulawesi
Faculty of Medicine Sam Ratulangi University, Manado

Gorontalo
Faculty of Medicine Gorontalo State University, Gorontalo

Central Sulawesi
Faculty of Medicine Tadulako University, Palu
Faculty of Medicine Alkhairaat University, Palu

South Sulawesi
Faculty of Medicine Hasanuddin University, Makassar
Faculty of Medicine Muslim Indonesia University, Makassar
Faculty of Medicine Bosowa University, Makassar
Faculty of Medicine Muhammadiyah University of Makassar, Makassar
Faculty of Medicine Alauddin Islamic State University, Makassar

Southeast Sulawesi
Faculty of Medicine Haluoleo University, Kendari

Maluku
Faculty of Medicine Pattimura University, Ambon

North Maluku
Faculty of Medicine Khairun University, Ternate

West Papua
Faculty of Medicine Papua University, Sorong Regency

Papua
Faculty of Medicine Cendrawasih University, Jayapura

See also
Medical school
List of medical schools

References
 PDAT (Pusat Data Analisa Tempo / Tempo Center of Data Analysis), 2007

Indonesia
Medical schools
Medical schools in Indonesia